The Dagombas or Dagbamba are a Gur ethnic group of northern Ghana, numbering more than 3.1 million people. The term Dagbamba is also used to refer to other descendants of Naa Gbewaa including the Mamprusi and Nanumba. They inhabit the Northern Region of Ghana in the Guinea savanna region. They speak the Dagbani language which belongs to the Mole-Dagbani sub-group of the Gur languages. There are more than 3 million native speakers of Dagbani. The Dagomba are historically related to the Mossi people. The Mossi Kingdoms were founded by Yennenga, a daughter of the founder of the Dagbon Kingdom, Naa Gbewaa. The Mohi/Mossi now have their homeland in central present-day Burkina Faso. Aside the Mossi, the Dagombas are the progenitors of the Bouna state of Ivory Coast, and the Dagaaba states of Upper West Region of Ghana. The homeland of the Dagomba is called Dagbon and now covers about 20,000 km2 in area.

Naa Gbewaa is regarded as the founder of the Dagbon Kingdom. People existed in Dagbon long before the arrival of Naa Gbewaa. Gbewaa, and his descendants centralised the kingdom.  Before Naa Gbewaa centralised the kingdom, there were decentralised states headed by the Tindaamba. Today, the Tindaamba still preserve the ancient Dagbon traditions that has been passed through the ages, leading traditional religious acts and solving problems of their constituents. Many Tindaamba are not appointed by the Yaa Naa, they are chosen by an oracle. However, they are subservient to Yaa Naa. Royalty in Dagbon is complex as it has evolved through the centuries. Dagomba are one of the ethnic groups with a sophisticated oral tradition woven around drums and other musical instruments. Thus, Dagbon history, until quite recently, has been passed down meticulously via oral tradition with drummers as professional griots known as Lunsi. According to oral tradition, the political history of Dagbon has its origin in the life story of a legend called Tohazie (translated as "red hunter").

Dagomba culture is heavily influenced by Islam, brought to the region by Soninke (known as Wangara by Ghanaians) traders between the 12th and 15th centuries. Since the time of Naa Zangina, Islam has been the state religion and Islam seems to be growing rapidly ever since. The reformist activities of Afa Anjura in the middle of the twentieth century caused entire communities to embrace the Islamic religion en masse. Inheritance in the Dagomba people is largely patrilineal, however, inheritance of certain Tindaamba is matrilineal. There are also female rulers with male subordinates such as the Gundo Naa and the Kpatu Naa. The Gundo Naa has vast land and head all female royals of Dagbon. Important festivals include the Damba, Bugum (fire festival) and the Islamic Eid festivals. The largest settlement of the Dagomba is Tamale, Ghana's third populous and the Northern Region's capital.

The Mossi and Dagomba states are among the great West African medieval empires. Beginning in the 12th century, they eventually ruled the lands of the entire northern Volta basin, which today includes all of northern Ghana and Burkina Faso. During their second northern expansion, the Mossi invasion reached eastern Maasina and Lake Débo  1400, Benka in c. 1433 and Walata in 1477-83 (these empires were in present-day Mali). According to Illiasu (1971) in his work The Origins of the Mossi-Dagomba states, the second period of the Mossi-Dagomba success came to an end with the restoration of Imperial Songhai power towards the close of the 15th century. Although the Mossi-Dagomba states have the same grandfather (Naa Gbewa), the Dagomba are traditionally regarded as "senior" to the Mossi states of Ouagadougou, Yatenga and Fada N'Gourma.

Origins

The aboriginal Dagombas have inhabited Northern for thousands of years. The Dagombas, who descended from Naa Gbewaa migrated from around the areas of Lake Chad after the break up of the Ghana Empire at the end of the 13th Century. Chiefs who are descendants of Gbewaa are the Nanima (singular: Naa) and aboriginal chiefs are the Tindaamba (singular: Tindana).

Kingdom of Dagbon

The homeland of the Dagombas is called Dagbon and covers about 20,000 km2 in area. Much of the area was occupied by Konkombas before the formation of Dagbon Kingdom. It forms part of the Northern Region of Ghana, which includes the Mamprusi, Nanumba, Gonja, Mossi, Gurunsi (in particular the Frafra and Kusasi peoples), the Wala people and Ligbi. The area constitutes fourteen administrative districts in present-day Ghana. These are the Tamale Metropolitan, Yendi, Savelugu and Sagnerigu municipals, and Tolon, Kumbungu, Nanton, Gushegu, Karaga, Zabzugu, Saboba, Sang, Tatale and Cheriponi districts. The king of the Dagbon Traditional Kingdom is the Ya-Na, whose court and administrative capital is at Yendi. Dagbon as a kingdom has never been subjugated until it was incorporated as a territory of the Gold Coast government. The Dagbon Kingdom has traditional administrative responsibilities hitherto acephalous groups like the Konkomba, Bimoba, Chekosi, Basaari, Chamba, Wala, Gurusi and Zantasi. The seat of the Ya-Na or king of Dagbon (literally translated as "King of Absolute Power") is a collection of lion and cow skins. Thus, the Dagbon or its political system is often called the Yendi Skin (not throne or crown or stool). Another characteristic of the Dagomba is that their houses are arranged in a certain order, where the chief or elderly man has his hut built in the centre.

Chieftaincy
One of the major features of Dagomba society is chieftaincy. Their system of chieftaincy is very hierarchical, with the Yaa-Naa, or paramount King, at its head and a tiered system of rulers below him. In Dagbon, chiefs traditionally sit on a stack of skins.

Notable Dagombas

Yakubu II - Last King of Dagbon.
Aliu Mahama - Former Vice President of Ghana from 2000 to 2008.
Haruna Yakubu - A past Vice Chancellor of University for Development Studies.
Haruna Iddrisu - A Ghanaian politician.
Afa Ajura - founder and leader of the Ahlus Sunnah wal Jamaa'a Islamic sect in Ghana

See also
 List of people from Dagbon
 List of rulers of the Kingdom of Dagbon
 Dagbani language
 Moore language
 Bugum Chugu (Fire Festival in Dagbon)
 Mossi people
 Naming customs of the Dagomba people

References

External links

 
Muslim communities in Africa
Ethnic groups in Ghana
History of Ghana
Former monarchies of Africa

Former countries in Africa
Islam in Ghana